The Calcasieu Parish School Board (CPSB) is a school district based in Lake Charles, Louisiana, United States. The CPSB operates all public schools in Calcasieu Parish, including the city of Lake Charles.

Demographics
Total students (at October 1, 2014): 32,271
Race/ethnicity
White: 61.1%
African American: 34.7%
Native American: 0.4%
Hispanic: 2.4%
Asian: 1.3%
Pacific Islander: 0.1%

School uniform
All CPSB students must wear school uniforms.

Schools

K-12 schools
 Bell City High School (Unincorporated area)
 Starks High School (Unincorporated area)

High schools
Zoned
 A. M. Barbe High School (Lake Charles)
 DeQuincy High School (DeQuincy)
 Sam Houston High School (Unincorporated area)
 LaGrange High School (Lake Charles)
 Sulphur High School (Sulphur)
 Sulphur High 9th Grade Campus (Opened 2004)
 Vinton High School (Vinton)
 Westlake High School (Westlake)
 Washington-Marion Magnet High School (Lake Charles)

Alternative
 Calcasieu Career Center (Lake Charles)
 College Street Vocational Center/Westlake T&I (Lake Charles)

6 - 12 schools
 Iowa High/Middle School (Iowa)

6 - 8 Middle schools
 S. P. Arnett Middle School (Westlake)
 DeQuincy Middle School (DeQuincy)
 LeBlanc Middle School (Sulphur)
 Housed inside is the Jake Drost Special School which serves special needs children in areas of the parish west of the Calcasieu River.
 W. W. Lewis Middle School (Sulphur)
 Maplewood Middle School (Sulphur)
 Ray D. Molo Middle School (Lake Charles)
 Moss Bluff Middle School (Unincorporated area)
 Oak Park Middle School (Lake Charles)
 Vinton Middle School (Vinton)
 S. J. Welsh Middle School (Lake Charles)
 Forrest K. White Middle School (Lake Charles)

Elementary schools
Zoned
 Barbe Elementary School (Lake Charles)
 Brentwood Elementary School (Lake Charles)
 J. D. Clifton Elementary School (Lake Charles)
 College Oaks Elementary School (Lake Charles)
 Combre-Fondel Elementary School (Lake Charles)
 Cypress Cove Elementary School (Sulphur)
 DeQuincy Elementary School (DeQuincy)
 DeQuincy Primary School (DeQuincy)
 Dolby Elementary School (Lake Charles)
 Fairview Elementary School (Unincorporated area)
 Frasch Elementary School (Sulphur)
 Gillis Elementary School (Unincorporated area)
 W. T. Henning Elementary School (Sulphur)
 Henry Heights Elementary School (Lake Charles)
 J. J. Johnson, II Elementary School (Lake Charles)
 M. J. Kaufman Elementary School (Unincorporated area)
 John F. Kennedy Elementary School (Lake Charles)
 E. K. Key Elementary School (Sulphur)
 LeBleu Settlement Elementary School (Unincorporated area)
 Maplewood Elementary School (Sulphur) 
 Moss Bluff Elementary School (Unincorporated area)
 A. A. Nelson Elementary School (Lake Charles)
 Oak Park Elementary School (Lake Charles)
 Prien Lake Elementary School (Lake Charles)
 St. John Elementary School (Lake Charles)
 Vincent Settlement Elementary School (Unincorporated area)
 R. W. Vincent Elementary School (Sulphur)
 Vinton Elementary School (Vinton)
 T. H. Watkins Elementary School (Lake Charles)
 J.I. Watson Elementary School (Iowa)
 Pearl Watson Elementary School (Lake Charles)
 Western Heights Elementary School (Westlake)
 Westwood Elementary School (Westlake)
 Ralph Wilson Elementary School (Lake Charles)
Application-based

 T. S. Cooley Elementary School (Lake Charles)

Other schools
 Lake Charles-Boston Academy of Learning (Lake Charles)

References

External links
 Calcasieu Parish School Board
 Archives of older webpages

School districts in Louisiana
Lake Charles, Louisiana
Education in Calcasieu Parish, Louisiana